San Nicolás de Carretas is a town in the Mexican state of Chihuahua. It serves as the municipal seat for the surrounding municipality of Gran Morelos. As of 2010, the town had a population of 726.

San Nicolás de Carretas was founded as a Franciscan mission in 1688.

References

Populated places in Chihuahua (state)
Populated places established in 1688
1688 establishments in New Spain